The Game Awards 2017 was an award show that honored the best video games of 2017, and took place at the Microsoft Theater in Los Angeles on December 7, 2017. The event was hosted by Geoff Keighley, and was live streamed around the world across various platforms, with 11.5 million viewers in total watching the event. The Legend of Zelda: Breath of the Wild won three awards, including Game of the Year. Two indie games, Cuphead and Hellblade: Senua's Sacrifice, also won three awards each.

Presentation
The presentation was held at the Microsoft Theater in Los Angeles on December 7, 2017 hosted by Geoff Keighley, and live streamed across sixteen different content platforms worldwide. An integrated public voting system was included on Google Search and Twitter; and on Twitch, the show had an interactive overlay that allowed viewers to predict award winners before they are announced, the first such use of one on the platform. Certain streaming platforms also incentivized viewers to watch the Awards presentation through their specific service by entering those viewers into raffles for free games.

A month before the show, Facebook began presenting a five-part making-of documentary series on it via its Watch video service, known as "The Road to The Game Awards". During the event, sales on some of the nominated games were held across numerous game distribution platforms, such as the PlayStation Network and Steam. Alongside a mini-documentary shown at the show, a special Industry Icon award was given to Carol Shaw, who was one of the first female video game designers in the industry.

Broadcast and viewership 
The show included musical performances from French indie pop band Phoenix and The Game Awards Orchestra, a mixed group consisting of an orchestra and other guest musicians, such as Avenged Sevenfold guitarist Synyster Gates and cellist Tina Guo, who performed music from a number of the nominated games. The show also had numerous guests as award presenters or commentators, such as Metal Gear series creator Hideo Kojima, Mortal Kombat series creator Ed Boon, Nintendo of America president Reggie Fils-Aimé, film director Guillermo del Toro, television producers Justin Roiland and Conan O'Brien, and actors Norman Reedus, Andy Serkis, Felicia Day, Aisha Tyler, and Zachary Levi.

One highlight of the ceremony, noted by several outlets, was a rant given by game director Josef Fares while being interviewed on stage by Keighley to discuss his game, A Way Out. Fares, who had a prior history in the film industry before starting video game development, started his rant by saying "Fuck the Oscars", before speaking about how the Game Awards ceremony helped to highlight the developers and personalities that were passionate about their work. He also spoke a bit to the then-recent situation around loot boxes and microtransactions related to Electronic Arts' game Star Wars Battlefront II; as Electronic Arts is also the publisher for A Way Out, Fares stated that while "It's nice to hate EA", that "All publishers fuck up sometimes, you know?", while expressing his appreciate for their support for his game. Fares said in a later interview that he was "caught up in the moment", but still believed in the general points he had been trying to make; specifically, Fares indicated that video games as a medium was still seen in its infancy by most other media sources and that the Game Awards was treating the industry with the proper respect.

Viewership 
Keighley reported that around 11.5 million viewers watched the show, tripling the 3.8 million viewers from The Game Awards 2016. Keighley believed part of this was their approach to gamify the show with the interactive winner predictions on their Twitch and Steam broadcasts, which also helped to increase the average length of time viewers watched, from about 25 minutes the previous year to 70 minutes in 2017. Keighley also attributes the higher viewership due to the quality of games that were released in 2017 and nominated, and the anticipation for yet-seen game trailers and new game announcements, though he wants to avoid future shows from being more like E3.

Game announcements
In addition to trailers and presentations for upcoming games and content for current ones, a short teaser for a game by FromSoftware was also shown, later revealed to be Sekiro: Shadows Die Twice. The show also included trailers from two films, Jumanji: Welcome to the Jungle and The Shape of Water. The list of games that were featured included:

 Accounting+
 Bayonetta and Bayonetta 2 Nintendo Switch ports
 Bayonetta 3
 Death Stranding
 Dreams
 Fade to Silence
 Fortnite
 GTFO
 In the Valley of Gods
 The Legend of Zelda: Breath of the Wild downloadable content (DLC)

 Metro Exodus
 PlayerUnknown's Battlegrounds
 Sea of Thieves
 Soulcalibur VI
 Vacation Simulator
 A Way Out
 Witchfire
 World War Z

Awards 
The nominees were announced on November 14, 2017. In order to be eligible, candidate games must have had either a commercial or early access release date on or before November 27, 2017. The list of nominees were selected by a panel of 51 people in the video game industry, with the top five games (or six in the case of ties) selected in each category presented as nominees. Public voting for awards ran from November 14 until December 6. Public voting only counted towards 10% of the winners' selection in the jury-voted awards, while it was the sole consideration for the fan's choice awards. At the end of polling, Keighley said that most of the categories had over five million votes each, and there was over eight million voters overall.

Two major award changes were made in the Awards structure for the 2017 show. First, the previous "Best Mobile/Handheld Game" was split into separate "Best Mobile Game" and "Best Handheld Game" awards, reflecting the differences in how handheld and mobile games are developed and marketed. Second, a new award for "Best Ongoing Game" was offered for games that continue to provide new content as a service model. Another new award, the Student Game Award, was established to highlight games developed by students in higher education programs, and was selected from a panel of five industry leaders: Todd Howard, Hideo Kojima, Ilkka Paananen, Kim Swift, and Vince Zampella.

All awards, except for Best Multiplayer, were announced during the December 7 presentation. Keighley reported this was an oversight related to a last-minute change in the trailer material for PlayerUnknown's Battlegrounds (which had won the award), and confirmed the winner the day after. Winners are listed first and shown in bold, and indicated with a double-dagger (‡).

Jury-voted awards

Fan's choice awards

Honorary awards

Games with multiple nominations and awards

References

External links 

2017 awards
2017 awards in the United States
2017 in Los Angeles
2017 in video gaming
The Game Awards ceremonies
2017 video game awards